Jeronimo or Jerónimo is the Portuguese and Spanish form of "Jerome". 

Those bearing it as a surname include:
 Tonicha Jeronimo (born 1977), a British actress
 Vlademir Jeronimo Barreto (born 1979), Brazilian footballer
 Claudemir Jerônimo Barreto (born 1981), Brazilian-born German footballer a.k.a. Cacau

Those bearing it as a given name include:
 Jerónimo de Alderete (1518–1556), Spanish conquistador
 Jerónimo Amione (born 1990), Mexican footballer
 Jerónimo de Azevedo (1560–1625), Portuguese fidalgo
 Jerónimo Barrales (born 1987), Argentinian footballer
 Jerónimo Fernandes de Cabrera Bobadilla y Mendoza, Viceroy of Perú
 Agustín Jerónimo de Iturbide y Huarte (1807–1866), son of the first Mexican Emperor Agustín I of Mexico
 Jeronimo Gomez (born 1976), American musician
 Jerónimo Lobo (1595–1678), Portuguese Jesuit missionary
 Jerónimo Saavedra (born 1936), Spanish politician
 Jerónimo de Sousa (born 1944), Portuguese politician
 Jerônimo de Sousa Monteiro (1870–1933), Brazilian politician
 Jerónimo Morales Neumann (born 1986), Argentinian footballer
 Jerónimo Treviño (1835–1914), Mexican governor and general
 Jerónimo Zurita y Castro (1512–1580), Spanish historian

Those bearing it as an artistic name include:
 Jerónimo (Alberto Pedro Gonzales), Argentina

See also 
 Geronimo (disambiguation)
 Hieronymus (disambiguation)
 Saint Jerome (disambiguation)
 San Geronimo (disambiguation)
 San Jerónimo (disambiguation)

References 

Spanish masculine given names
Spanish-language surnames